Voprosy Istorii (Russian: Вопросы истории, translated Questions of History) is a Russian academic journal for historical studies. It is published monthly by the Institute of General History of the Russian Academy of Sciences. The journal covers both Russian and world history.

History
The current publication started as two separate journals. The first publication, Istorik-Marksist was published from 1926 to 1941. The second publication, begun in 1931, was known as Bor'ba Klassov, but in 1937 changed its name to Istoricheskii Zhurnal. Istorik-Marksist was merged into Istoricheskii Zhurnal in 1941. In 1945 the journal's name was changed to the current Voprosy Istorii.

In 1957 the Russian historian Édourd Burdzhalov was dismissed as deputy editor of the journal after he published an article about the Bolshevik's confusion following the February Revolution in 1917. At that time, it was one of just three journals available to Soviet historians, the others being Istoricheskie Zapiski, which specialised in medieval and modern Russian history, and Vestnik Drevnei Istorii which dealt with ancient history.

In 2004, East View began to digitise the journal from its 200,000 pages in 950 issues.

List of editors-in-chief
The editors-in-chief of Voprosy Istorii have been:

Historian-Marxist 
 1926-1930: Andrei Vasilievich Shestakov
 1930-1932: Mikhail Nikolaevich Pokrovskiy
 1933-1938: Nikolai Mikhailovich Lukin
 1938-1944: Emeliyan Mikhailovich Yaroslavskiy

Problems of History 
 1945-1949: Vyacheslav Petrovich Volgin
 1949-1950: Alexander Dmitrievich Udaltsov
1950-1953: Petr Nikolaevich Tretyakov
 1953-1957: Anna Mikhailovna Pankratova
 1958-1960: Sergei Fedorovich Naida
 1960-1987: Vladimir Grigorievich Trukhanovskiy
 1987-2017: Akhmed Akhmedovich Iskenderov
Since 2017: P. A. Iskenderov

Editions available on line
 [ No. 7, 1947]

See also 
 List of history journals

References

External links
The history of Voprosy istorii by E. A. Yastrzhembskaya

History journals
Russian Academy of Sciences academic journals
Russian-language journals